Atherton is an unincorporated community in northern Otter Creek Township, Vigo County, in the U.S. state of Indiana. It is part of the Terre Haute metropolitan area.

History
Atherton was laid out and platted October 7, 1871. The original plat was signed by Newton Rogers, Sarah A. Denny and Mary J. Rogers. The line of the north part of the plat marked the dividing line between Vigo County and Parke County. The early town was laid out around Atherton's railroad station.

A post office was established at Atherton in 1881, and remained in operation until it was discontinued in 1934.

Geography

References

Unincorporated communities in Indiana
Unincorporated communities in Vigo County, Indiana
Terre Haute metropolitan area